Mesosa alternata is a species of beetle in the family Cerambycidae. It was described by Stephan von Breuning in 1936. It is known from Taiwan, China and Malaysia.

References

alternata
Beetles described in 1936